The 155th (Quinte) Battalion, CEF was a unit in the Canadian Expeditionary Force during the First World War.  Based in Barriefield, Ontario, the unit began recruiting in late 1915 in Hastings and Prince Edward Counties.  After sailing to England in October 1916, the battalion was absorbed into the 154th Battalion, CEF and 6th Reserve Battalion on December 8, 1916.  The 155th (Quinte) Battalion, CEF had one Officer Commanding: Lieut-Col. M. K. Adams.

References
Meek, John F. Over the Top! The Canadian Infantry in the First World War. Orangeville, Ont.: The Author, 1971.

Battalions of the Canadian Expeditionary Force
Military units and formations of Ontario
Military units and formations established in 1915
Military units and formations disestablished in 1916
1915 establishments in Ontario
Argyll Light Infantry
Hastings and Prince Edward Regiment